The fantasy of manners is a subgenre of fantasy literature that also partakes of the nature of a comedy of manners (though it is not necessarily humorous). Such works generally take place in an urban setting and within the confines of a fairly elaborate, and almost always hierarchical, social structure. The term was first used in print by science fiction critic Donald G. Keller in an article, The Manner of Fantasy, in the April 1991 issue of The New York Review of Science Fiction; author Ellen Kushner has said that she suggested the term to Keller.

Influences
"Fantasy of manners" is fantasy literature that owes as much or more to the comedy of manners as it does to the traditional heroic fantasy of J. R. R. Tolkien and other authors of high fantasy. Author Teresa Edgerton has stated that this is not what Keller originally meant by the term, but "the term has since taken on a life of its own". The protagonists are not pitted against fierce monsters or marauding armies, but against their neighbors and peers; the action takes place within a society, rather than being directed against an external foe; duels may be fought, but the chief weapons are wit and intrigue. While there is occasional overlap with steampunk or gaslamp fantasy, fantasy of manners is more grounded in reality than either of those subgenres, which make freer use of technology and magic respectively.

Major influences on the subgenre include the social novels of Jane Austen, the drawing room comedies of Oscar Wilde and P. G. Wodehouse, and the historical romances of Georgette Heyer. Many authors also draw from nineteenth century popular novelists such as Anthony Trollope, the Brontë sisters, and Charles Dickens. Traditional romances of swashbuckling adventure such as The Three Musketeers by Alexandre Dumas, The Scarlet Pimpernel by Baroness Orczy, or the works of Rafael Sabatini may also be influences. The Ruritanian romances typified by The Prisoner of Zenda by Anthony Hope, or George Barr McCutcheon's Graustark itself, are also of some consequence as literary precedents, as are the historical novels of Dorothy Dunnett. Although such works all contain elements that influenced the genre, the first example of the genre-proper is widely considered to be Gormenghast by Mervyn Peake.

Characteristics
A typical fantasy of manners tale will involve a romantic adventure that turns on some point of social punctilio or intrigue. Magic, fantastic races, and legendary creatures are downplayed within the genre, or dismissed entirely, and the technology is typically no more advanced than is expected of the period. Indeed, but for the fact that the settings are usually entirely fictional, some of the books considered "fantasy of manners" could be also considered historical fiction, and some do cross over with historical fantasy. Conflicts tend to be of lower stakes, typically limited to social consequences instead of life-and-death situations, and plots may involve courtship and marriage.

Other authors who have written books considered to fall into the subgenre include:
Katherine Addison (The Goblin Emperor)
Kage Baker
Galen Beckett (The Magicians and Mrs Quent series)
Marie Brennan (Memoirs of Lady Trent series)
Steven Brust (Khaavren Romances)
Lois McMaster Bujold (A Civil Campaign)
Emma Bull
Stephanie Burgis (Snowspelled and its sequels)
Gail Carriger (Parasol Protectorate series, beginning with Soulless)
Zen Cho (Sorcerer to the Crown)
Susanna Clarke (Jonathan Strange & Mr Norrell)
Pamela Dean
E. R. Eddison
Teresa Edgerton (Mask and Dagger duology)
Lynn Flewelling
John M. Ford
Barbara Hambly
Heather Rose Jones
Mary Robinette Kowal (Glamourist Histories series)
Ellen Kushner (The Riverside series, beginning with Swordspoint)
Scott Lynch
Patricia A. McKillip (Ombria in Shadow)
Michael Moorcock
Alexei Panshin
Mervyn Peake
C. L. Polk (The Kingston Cycle, beginning with Witchmark)
Natasha Pulley
Tansy Rayner Roberts (Teacup Magic series)
Delia Sherman
Sherwood Smith (Crown Duel)
Caroline Stevermer
Charles Stross (The Merchant Princes series)
Molly Tanzer 
Jack Vance
Paula Volsky
Tilly Wallace (Manners and Monsters series)
Jo Walton (Tooth and Claw)
Walter Jon Williams (Drake Maijstral series)
Patricia Wrede

Screen versions considered fantasy of manners include:

Jonathan Strange & Mr Norrell (2015): Television miniseries adaptation of Susanna Clarke's novel about rival magicians in Regency England.

Pride and Prejudice and Zombies (2016): A straightforward film revision of the classic novel, with Elizabeth Bennet slaying hordes of the undead between unwanted proposals.

A class of fantasies set in contemporary times and blending some characteristics of fantasies of manners with the subgenre urban fantasy has been dubbed, tongue-even-further-in-cheek, elfpunk.

References

Fantasy genres